Perieni is a commune in Vaslui County, Western Moldavia, Romania. It is composed of a single village, Perieni. It included four other villages until 2004, when these were split off to form Ciocani Commune.

References

Communes in Vaslui County
Localities in Western Moldavia